Linda Kay Ludgrove (born 8 September 1947) is a retired English backstroke swimmer.

Swimming career
Raised in Sydenham, Ludgrove won individual gold medals at 110 yards backstroke and 220 yards backstroke at both the 1962 and 1966 Commonwealth Games. As part of the English team she won silver in the 1962 4×110 yards medley relay and gold in the 1966 relay.

She competed at the 1964 Summer Olympics in the 4×100 m medley relay and the 100 m backstroke and finished fifth and sixth, respectively. She won three medals at the 1962 and 1966 European Championships. At the ASA National British Championships she won the 110 yards backstroke title five times (1962, 1963, 1964, 1966, 1967) and the 220 yards backstroke title three times (1964, 1966, 1967).

She finished third in the 1962 BBC Sports Personality of the Year. She held seven world records. She retired from swimming in 1967.

Personal life
Ludgrove was born to William and Gladys Ludgrove; she has a brother, Terence. After marriage she changed her last name to Lillo.

References

External links
 Lewisham Council, Lewisham born athletes

1947 births
Living people
People from Sydenham, London
English female swimmers
Olympic swimmers of Great Britain
Swimmers at the 1962 British Empire and Commonwealth Games
Swimmers at the 1966 British Empire and Commonwealth Games
Swimmers at the 1964 Summer Olympics
Commonwealth Games gold medallists for England
Commonwealth Games silver medallists for England
European Aquatics Championships medalists in swimming
Commonwealth Games medallists in swimming
20th-century English women
21st-century English women
Medallists at the 1962 British Empire and Commonwealth Games
Medallists at the 1966 British Empire and Commonwealth Games